Baten is a surname. Notable people with the surname include:

Heinrich Baten (fl. late 13th century), Belgian-German astronomer
Jörg Baten (born 1965), German economic historian
Raymond Baten (born 1989), Aruban footballer

See also 
Baten Kaitos, or Zeta Ceti
Baten Kaitos: Eternal Wings and the Lost Ocean, role-playing video game (2003)
Baten Kaitos Origins, role-playing video game (2006)

Dutch-language surnames
German-language surnames